Noël-Noël (born Lucien Noël, 9 August 1897 – 5 October 1989) was a French actor and screenwriter.

Partial filmography

 La prison en folie (1931) - Yves Larsac
 When Do You Commit Suicide? (1931) - Léon Mirol
 Mistigri (1931) - Zamore
 La brigade du bruit (1931)
 A Father Without Knowing It (1932) - Léon Jacquet
 Monsieur Albert (1932) - Monsieur Albert
 Mon coeur balance (1932) - Le comte Noel
 A Star Disappears (1932) - Himself
 Pour vivre heureux (1932) - Jean Mauclair
 Les jeux sont faits (1932)
 Mannequin (1933) - Alfred
 Vive la compagnie (1934) - Jean-Jacques Bonneval
 Une fois dans la vie (1934) - Léon Saval
 Adémaï aviateur (1934) - Adémaï
 Mam'zelle Spahi (1934) - Bréchu - l'ordonnance du colonel
 Adémaï au moyen âge (1935) - Adémaï
 Moutonnet (1936) - Moutonnet et Mérac
 Tout va très bien madame la marquise (1936) - Yonnik Le Ploumanech
 L'innocent (1938) - Nicolas
 La famille Duraton (1939) - Adrien Martin
 Sur le plancher des vaches (1940) - Jean Durand
 La femme que j'ai le plus aimée (1942) - Le chirurgien
 Adémaï bandit d'honneur (1943) - Adémaï
 A Cage of Nightingales (1945) - Clément Mathieu
 Mr. Orchid (1946) - Édouard Martin
 Les Casse Pieds (1948) - Lecturer
 Return to Life (1949) - René (segment 4 : "Le retour de René")
 La Vie chantée (1951, Director) - L'auteur
 The Seven Deadly Sins (1952) - Le directeur (Saint-Pierre) (segment "Paresse, La / Sloth")
 La Fugue de Monsieur Perle (1952) - Bernard Perle
 Le fil à la patte (1954) - Le comte Fernand du Bois d'Enghien - un viveur sur le point de se marier
 The French, They Are a Funny Race (1955) - Monsieur Taupin
 The Terror with Women (1956) - Aimé Morin
 Bonjour Toubib (1957) - Le docteur Forget
 On Foot, on Horse, and on Wheels (1957) - Léon Martin
 Les Truands (1957) - Cahuzac
 Le septième ciel (1958) - Guillaume Lestrange
 A Dog, a Mouse, and a Sputnik (1958) - Léon Martin
 Messieurs les ronds de cuir (1959) - Monsieur de la Hourmerie
 The Old Guard (1960) - Blaise Poulossière
 Jessica (1962) - Old Crupi
 Girl on the Road (1962) - Le baron
 La sentinelle endormie (1966) - Le docteur Mathieu

External links

1897 births
1989 deaths
French male film actors
French male screenwriters
Male actors from Paris
20th-century French screenwriters
20th-century French male actors
20th-century French male writers